The Ahar culture, also known as the Banas culture is a Chalcolithic archaeological culture on the banks of Ahar River of southeastern Rajasthan state in India, lasting from  3000 to 1500 BCE, contemporary and adjacent to the Indus Valley civilization. Situated along the Banas and Berach Rivers, as well as the Ahar River, the Ahar–Banas people were exploiting the copper ores of the Aravalli Range to make axes and other artefacts. They were sustained on a number of crops, including wheat and barley.

Geographical extent
More than 90 sites of the Ahar culture have been identified to date. The main distribution seems to be concentrated in the river valleys of Banas and its tributaries. A number of sites with Ahar culture level are also found from Jawad, Mandsaur, Kayatha and Dangwada in Madhya Pradesh state. In Rajasthan, most of the sites are located in Udaipur, Chittorgarh, Dungarpur, Banswara, Ajmer, Tonk and Bhilwara districts, which include, Ahar, Gilund, Bansen, Keli, Balathal, Alod, Palod, Khor, Amoda, Nangauli, Champakheri, Tarawat, Fachar, Phinodra, Joera, Darauli, Gadriwas, Purani Marmi, Aguncha and Ojiyana.

In 2003 excavations at Gilund, archaeologists discovered a large cache of seal impressions dating to 2100–1700 BC. A large bin filled with more than 100 seal impressions was found by a team led by archaeologists from the University of Pennsylvania Museum and the Deccan College (Pune).

The design motifs of the seals are generally quite simple, with wide-ranging parallels from various Indus civilization sites. But also, there are parallels with seals from the Bactria–Margiana Archaeological Complex (BMAC) in Central Asia and northern Afghanistan, 1,000 miles to the northwest.

Pottery 

Ahar-banas culture: Based on the pottery excavated here, this site is considered as a separate archaeological culture / subculture.

Typical Ahar pottery is a Black-and-Red ware (BRW) with linear and dotted designs painted on it in white pigment and has a limited range of shapes, which include bowls, bowls-on-stands, elongated vases and globular vases. The Ahar culture also had equally distinctive brightly slipped Red Ware, a Tan ware, ceramics in Burnished Black that were incised Thin Red ware, as well as incised and otherwise decorated Gray ware fabrics.

The pottery had a black top and reddish bottom, with paintings in white on the black surface. Because of these distinctive features, Ahar, when it was first noticed by R C Agrawal, was called the "black and red ware culture". This is in a way true, because this was primarily the pottery used by the inhabitants of Ahar for drinking and eating.

See also
Malwa culture
Jorwe culture
Pottery in the Indian subcontinent

Notes

References
Jane McIntosh, The ancient Indus Valley: new perspectives,  ABC-CLIO, 2008, 77f.

External links
Rohit Parihar, Piecing the Ahar puzzle. Excavation of sites from the 4,500-year-old Ahar culture provide clues to the link between the Harappans and their predecessors. 12 March 2001 indiatoday.intoday.in
Cache of Seal Impressions Discovered in Western India Offers Surprising New Evidence for Cultural Complexity in Little-known Ahar–Banas Culture, Circa 3000–1500 B.C. University of Pennsylvania Museum of Archaeology and Anthropology

Chalcolithic cultures of Asia
Archaeological cultures of South Asia
History of Rajasthan
Archaeological cultures in India